The following lists events that happened during 1887 in Chile.

Incumbents
President of Chile: José Manuel Balmaceda

Events

November
20 November - The radical left wing Democrat Party is founded.

Births
date unknown - Otto Junge (d. 1978)
27 February - Ernesto Balmaceda (d. 1906)
14 May - Carlos Frödden (d. 1976)
15 September - Carlos Dávila (d. 1955)
25 September - Jerónimo Méndez (d. 1959)

Deaths
24 November - Carlos Condell (b. 1843)

References 

 
Years of the 19th century in Chile
Chile